Pozzo Ardizzi surname comes from the city of Vigevano province of Pavia, Italy, which was formed around the middle of the fifteenth century from a branch of the family that is separated from the noble surname Ardizzi.

History 
Wealthy landowners, woods and fabrics and wool merchants were settled outside the city in the Valley district, facing the path of Pavia, at the foot of the terrace of the Ticino river, parallel to the coast of the municipality.
Unfortunately still unknown how and why the surname originated compound Pozzo Ardizzi, the more relevant hypothesis is that this change was due to reasons of nobility (for example, political situations or union between families) .

Its first member was Antonio Pozzo Ardizzi, a descendant of Francesco Ardizzi (d. Vigevano in the year 1399). Antonio, along with his son Cardinal Abramo Ardizzi (also referred to as the Abraam Pozo-Ardicio), bishop of Senigallia, founded in Vigevano, among 1421 and 1424, a church in San Martino valuation under the title Assunzione Beatissima della Vergine Maria, e di S. Jeronimo Dottor della Santa Chiesa, e di S. Maria Maddalena. For this action, obtained from Pope Eugene IV plenary indulgence of three years imprisonment and a period of quarantine for the feast of "Madonna della Assunzione" and the feast of "Santo Ieronimo": Traditiio possessionis ac litentia concessa etc.

On the altar wall of the chapel, on the right hand, it could read the inscription:

The church was destroyed in 1800 and one of his relics donated by Abramo, was transferred to the church of S. Francesco, in Vigevano.

Abramo Ardizzi played an important role as a diplomat in the peace achieved on June 6, 1449 between Vigevano and Count Francesco Sforza. Following the agreement, Vigevano accepted Francesco Sforza as Lord prompting the entry of an armed contingent, the cancellation of the right to loot and put the city under the protection of The Duchess Bianca Maria Visconti (wife and daughter of the Duke Francesco Filippo Maria Visconti, ruler of Milan). 
Abramo was governor of Alessandria, ambassador of the Duke Filippo before the king of France, Carlos VII and King Naples Renato, Duke of Anjou (Anji), Count of Provence. In 1455 he was mayor of Vigevano. 
He obtained from Filippo the castle and the land of Colonnella in Abruzzo, with the title of Count, in return for services in the embassies.

Poemetto Latino 
Excerpt from the poem De originibus Viglaevanensis populi (Initia et populi nostri Viglevanensis origins) about the origin of the city of Vigevano, written by the "father Dominican" Agostino della Porta (Della-Porta) on July 22, 1490, which refers to the, Ardizzi family:

Family tree

Still continues the family tradition of transferring firstborn son to firstborn son  a picture with the Pozzo Ardizzi genealogy tree which begins with the description of the sons of Antonio, Luchino and Mateo in the fifteenth century and ends with their descendants in the nineteenth century.

In 2007, Daniel Pozzo Ardizzi put in charged of document recovery to Mario Silvio Goren, restorer of historic and artistic collections and teaching in the field of preventive conservation and restoration.

Nineteenth, twentieth and twenty-first centuries 
During the last years of the nineteenth century, some descendants of the name Pozzo Ardizzi migrate from Vigevano to the Argentina, which initially established in the southern province of Buenos Aires in the city of Bahía Blanca: Cesare F. Antonio, Rosa, Catterina, Luigi and Giovanni Battista. 
Giovanni died in 1916 and his wife, along with his three children born in Argentina (two males and one female) back to Italy. The other brothers will remain in South America. 
If we stand in the twenty-first century, as many descendants with the surname Pozzo Ardizzi is located in the Argentina, with small families distributed in Italy and Brazil.

The writer 
Luigi Pozzo Ardizzi marries Lucia Fantino and had three children, one of whom will be Luis Hipólito Antonio Pozzo Ardizzi (08/13/1901 - December 1965). Teacher, writer and journalist, played a significant role in the Argentine radio drama during the 1940 and 1950. His contribution to the genre was with the creation of various works and in the direction of radio companies. He also wrote in the newspaper La Razón, La Prensa, the editorial Atlantida and the Caras y Caretas magazine. Published humorous stories, novels and poetry.

La Pichona

A son of Cesare F. Antonio Pozzo Ardizzi, César Juan Bautista, bought in 1909 in the city of Tandil, at 17 years of age, a cart called "La Pichona". The vehicle was about 6 meters long by 1.30 wide, plus two rear wheels of 3.26 meters in diameter and 1600 kilos Lapacho wood built with 22 spokes.

"La Pichona" was drawn by 16 horses, all solid blacks, who were called by their names. Using a five-foot whip and drawing circles in the air, without touching the animals, the wagon was mobilized for 80 km to transport wool and grain from the city of Carmen de Patagones to Stroeder (which end of the rail was until 1922, in the railway corridor coming from the city of Bahía Blanca) where the route was normally 5 days and complications of time could be extended to 20 days. After returning to Patagones products from Buenos Aires. 
"La Pichona" was the last major-drawn transport and the location of the tracks until Patagones in 1922, the Pozzo Ardizzi family reduced communicating their actions near the sites that were not served by rail.

In the 50 was abandoned in a field (Cañada Honda), and in 1969 the Pozzo Ardizzi family the donation to the Historical Museum Francisco de Viedma. By Mrs. Emma Nozzi director proceeds to his rescue and exhibition as a historical and patrimonial vehicle in front "7 de Marzo" square. However, in this area was built a Civic Center thus shoved to "La Pichona" in the then Club Hípico Fuerte del Carmen, exposed to damage, vandalism and inclement weather. 
After several political efforts to rescue the cart had not proven, in 2009 the Pozzo Ardizzi family decided directly retrieve "La Pichona " and Alberto Pozzo Ardizzi requested for the restoration to the blacksmith Luis Facio.

Upon completion of the work that required 8 months of arduous and meticulous work, "La Pichona", possibly one of the few vehicles of similar characteristics that are still in Argentina, was deposited in a square on January 8, 2011, between Bernal and Hipólito Yrigoyen streets of the city of Carmen de Patagones province of Buenos Aires.

References (surname documents)  

 Ardici
 

 Ardicii
 
 
 
 

 Ardiciique
 
 
 
 
 

 Ardiciis
 
 
 
 
 
 
 
 
 

 Ardicij
 

 Ardicio
 
 
 

 Ardicio del Pozzo
 

 Ardicium
 
 
 

 Ardicius
 
 
 
 

 Ardicivm
 
 

 Ardicivs
 
 

 Arditia
 
 

 Arditiis
 
 
 
 

 Arditij
 
 

 Arditij Pozzi
 arditio
 

 Arditio de Puteo
 
 

 arditio et Pozo
 
 

 Arditiosque
 
 

 Ardizi
 
 

* Ardizzi
 
 
 
 
 
 
 
 
 
 
 
 
 
 
 
 
 
 
 
 

 Ardizzi Pozzo
 
 

 Ardizzo
 

 Ardizzo de Puteo
 
 

 Dal Pozzo Ardizzi
 

 de Ardicii
 
 
 
 
 

 de Ardiciis
 
 
 
 
 
 

 de ardicijs / de Ardicijs
 
 
 
 
 
 

 de Ardicio
 

 de Ardizzi
 

 de Arditiij
 

 de Arditiis
 
 
 
 

 de arditijs
 '
 
 

 degli Ardizi
 
 

 Del Pozo Arditij
 
 

 Del Pozzo Ardizzi
 
 
 
 
 
 
 
 

 delli Arditij
 
 

 Poza et Arditia
 
 

 Pozo-Ardicio
 

 Pozzi Ardizzi
 
 

 Pozzo Ardizzi
 
 
 
 
 
 

 Puteo Arditij
 
 

 Puteus Ardicii

References

External links 
 Pozzo Ardizzi Genealogy surname.
 Palío delle contrade dí Vigevano.
 Archivio Storico di Vigevano.
 Biblioteca pubblica e Casa della Cultura Fondazione "Achille Marazza".
 Istituto della Enciclopedia italiana.
 Biblioteca Comunale Centrale (Milano).
 Biblioteca Casanatense (Roma).

Surnames
Italian families